Below is a list of the locations for the congressional papers of the United States senators and representative of West Virginia.

U.S. senators from West Virginia

U.S. representatives from West Virginia

See also
 List of United States senators from West Virginia
 List of United States representatives from West Virginia

Sources 
 Biographical Directory of the United States Congress, 1774 - present
 History, Art & Archives of the U.S. House of Representatives

References 

Libraries in West Virginia
Government of West Virginia
Archives in the United States
Legislative libraries
University and college academic libraries in the United States
West Virginia Congressional papers
Research libraries in the United States